The Bangladesh cricket team toured Sri Lanka from 3 to 31 March 2013. The tour consisted of two Tests, three One Day Internationals (ODIs) and a Twenty20 International (T20I).

Test series

1st Test

2nd Test

ODI series

1st ODI

2nd ODI

3rd ODI

T20I series

Only T20I

References

2013 in Sri Lankan cricket
2013 in Bangladeshi cricket
International cricket competitions in 2012–13
2012-13
Sri Lankan cricket seasons from 2000–01